Ádám Bodor (born 22 February 1936 in Cluj) is a Hungarian author of Transylvanian Hungarian origin.

Life and writing 
Bodor was born in Romania to a staunchly anti-communist father and was himself an anti-communist. In his youth he believed in Transylvanian independence and overthrowing the Communist state. At seventeen he was arrested by the Securitate. After being freed he studied at a Calvinist seminary and began writing. After this he left Romania for Hungary and then spent some time in the West. Several of his works have been adapted to film.

Bibliography 

 A tanú (1969)
 Plusz-mínusz egy nap (1974)
 Megérkezés északra (1978)
 Milyen is egy hágó? (1980)
 A Zangezur hegység (1981)
 Az Eufrátesz Babilonnál (1985)
 Sinistra körzet (1992). The Sinistra Zone, trans. Paul Olchváry (New Directions, 2013)
 Vissza a fülesbagolyhoz (1992)
 Az érsek látogatása (1999)
 A börtön szaga. Válaszok Balla Zsófia kérdéseire. Egy korábbi rádióinterjú változata (2001)
 A részleg (2006)
 Az utolsó szénégetők. Tárcák 1978–1981 (2010)
 Állomás, éjszaka. Tízkezes egy Bodor novellára (2011)
 Verhovina madarai (2011). The Birds of Verhovina, trans. Peter Sherwood (Jantar, 2021)
 A barátkozás lehetőségei (2016)
 Sehol (2019)
 Az értelmezés útvesztői. Tizenöt beszélgetés (2021)

References 

Hungarian male poets
Writers from Cluj-Napoca
1936 births
Living people
20th-century Hungarian poets
20th-century Hungarian male writers